Territory located in present-day Benin.

Oba = Ruler.

Sources
rulers.org/benitrad

See also
Benin
Yoruba states
Rulers of the Yoruba state of Icha
Rulers of the Yoruba state of Ketu
Rulers of the Yoruba state of Sabe
Rulers of the Yoruba state of Oyo
Lists of office-holders

Yoruba history
Lists of African rulers
Benin history-related lists
Government of Benin